The Association for the Advancement of Wound Care (AAWC) is a non-profit
organization that takes a multi-disciplinary approach to the care of wounds.
Their official journal is the Ostomy Wound Management.

References

Medical associations based in the United States